Chatzidakis is a surname. Notable people with the surname include:

 Kostis Chatzidakis (born 1965), Greek politician
 Larry Chatzidakis (born 1949), American politician
 Zoé Chatzidakis, French mathematician